Richard Brook was Chief Executive of the UK deafblind charity Sense, The National Deafblind and Rubella Association. He was appointed in July 2008 and left in September 2010. Prior to this he was Chief Executive of the Public Guardianship Office and then first Public Guardian and Chief Executive of the Office of the Public Guardian when this was established on 1 October 2007, until July 2008. He was previously the Chief Executive of Mind, the mental health charity, and has many years experience in the public and not-for-profit sectors.

References

External links
 http://www.sense.org.uk
 http://www.publicguardian.gov.uk

English chief executives
Year of birth missing (living people)
Living people
Place of birth missing (living people)